State Road 409 (NM 409) is a  state highway in the US state of New Mexico. NM 409's southern terminus is at Bottomless Lake State Park, and the northern terminus is at U.S. Route 380 (US 380) east of Roswell.

Major intersections

See also

References

409
Transportation in Chaves County, New Mexico